C-Note (also stylized as Cnote) was a Latin pop boy band from Orlando, Florida. The group started with the members Andrew Rogers, Jose Martinez, Raul Molina and David Perez. Then the group became a quintet with the addition of Josh Correa, Orlando Torres and Vincent Pesante after the departure of Rogers and Martinez. The quartet scored success in 1999 with their debut album, Different Kind of Love.

History
The group formed in 1997 in Orlando for the purposes of performing in a talent show. Three of the group's members had been in a previous vocal harmony group, but the five-member group lost two members, and a fourth was recruited, completing the group's later lineup. Their performance at the competition resulted in attention from the backers of Backstreet Boys and 'N Sync, and soon (mar 6) after a record deal ensued. Incorporating Latin elements into their dance-pop sound,the group toured America in 1998 and released their debut album, Different Kind of Love, on Sony Records the next year. Different Kind of Love spawned a radio hit, "Wait Til I Get Home", which peaked at #33 on Billboard's Top 40 Mainstream charts in 1999. It also peaked at number 42 in Australia.  

Different Kind of Love peaked at #163 on the Billboard Top 200.

Discography

Studio albums
 Different Kind of Love (1999)
 Cnote (2007)
 Chivalry (2008)

Extended plays 
 Wepa (2007)
 Forgive Me (2007)

Singles
 "Wait Til I Get Home" (1999)
 "Shine" (2001)
 "Forgive Me" (Acoustic Version) (2008)

References

External links
 
 
 

American pop music groups
American boy bands
Musical groups established in 1997
Musical groups disestablished in 2008
Musical groups from Orlando, Florida
Musical quartets
Musical quintets